A Little More Livin' is the second studio album by American country music singer Trent Willmon, released on June 13, 2006 on Columbia Records Nashville. It features the singles "On Again Tonight" and "So Am I", which peaked at #27 and #59 on the Hot Country Songs charts, respectively. After the latter peaked, Willmon exited Columbia's roster.

Track listing

Personnel
Jim "Moose" Brown – piano
J. T. Corenflos – electric guitar, baritone guitar
Chad Cromwell – drums
Eric Darken – percussion
Larry Franklin – fiddle, mandolin
Kevin "Swine" Grantt – bass guitar
David Grissom – electric guitar, baritone guitar
Wes Hightower – background vocals
Kirk "Jelly Roll" Johnson – harmonica
Mike Johnson – steel guitar
Tim Lauer – accordion
Frank Rogers – baritone guitar
Bryan Sutton – acoustic guitar, banjo, gut string guitar, bouzouki
Dennis Wage – B3 organ
Trent Willmon – lead vocals

Chart performance

References

2006 albums
Albums produced by Frank Rogers (record producer)
Columbia Records albums
Trent Willmon albums